Harri Aravinthan (born 22 February 2000) is an English cricketer. He made his first-class debut on 28 February 2020, for Tamil Union Cricket and Athletic Club in the 2019–20 Premier League Tournament in Sri Lanka. Prior to his first-class debut, he has also played for Surrey 2nd XI in England.

References

External links
 

2000 births
Living people
English cricketers
Cricketers from Greater London
Tamil Union Cricket and Athletic Club cricketers
English people of Sri Lankan Tamil descent
British Asian cricketers